The X-Terminators are fictional characters appearing in American comic books published by Marvel Comics.

History

The name "X-Men" was originally used by X-Factor at that group's inception.  The five original X-Men (Angel, Beast, Cyclops, Iceman, and Marvel Girl) had founded X-Factor Investigations, and posed as normal humans purported to be an organization of mutant-hunters. When they went into action in costume in public, they posed as another mutant team under the name X-Terminators.  Eventually, when X-Factor realized that this ruse was actually a ploy by their former business manager Cameron Hodge to worsen human-mutant relations, they abandoned the X-Terminators identity.

In their time posing as mutant-hunters, X-Factor secretly gathered together a number of mutants, including some Morlocks and several adolescents. The group consisted of Boom-Boom, Rusty Collins, Rictor, Skids, and two younger children, Leech and Artie Maddicks.

These young trainees were split between two boarding schools separated by about a mile. Artie and Leech were sent to a school for dyslexics. They enjoyed it there, especially after they convinced the teachers that they should be kept together. The older kids did not have such an easy time of it, attending Phillips Exeter Academy (a real-life elite boarding school), and being tormented by the other students. Rusty himself, however, had gone to prison voluntarily, to answer for the accidental injuries he had caused with his flame powers.

When the events of "Inferno" began, goblins, sensing the powers in Artie and Leech, kidnapped them out of their beds at school. The demons were supposed to have gathered younger, powerful children but were initially confused.

Taki, their new friend, fought the demons with his power to craft complex machinery from nearby objects. The demons knocked him out, escaping with the boys. Taki then formed a flying machine in order to gather the rest of the group. Initially, Rusty did not want to leave his prison cell, but agreed to do so when he understood the kids were in danger.

Artie, Leech and Taki became prisoners of the demons for a while, with Taki forced to make complex machines that enhanced the powers of the demon leader N'astirh. The rest of the team joined up with the New Mutants. All the children kidnapped by the demons, including Artie, Leech, and Taki, were eventually rescued safely.

The younger kids were returned to school and, the older members joined forces with the New Mutants, effectively ending the team.

The title X-Terminators was revived in 2022 for a limited series in the Destiny of X line, featuring Jubilee, Dazzler, Boom-Boom, and Wolverine.

X-Terminators Members
In 1988, the team debuted in X-Terminators #1.

In other media
Boom-Boom, Rusty Collins, Skids, and Wiz Kid appeared on the X-Men animated series. There they are orphans whom Cyclops met while visiting his old orphanage in Nebraska. A man known as Killgrave offered to help and adopted the orphans, seemingly out of charity. In reality, Killgrave, a mutant himself with telepathic abilities, wanted to use their powers to take over as governor. Scott was able to snap Rusty and the others out of Killgrave's hypnotic brainwashing in the end.

References

External links
 

Fictional organizations
1988 comics debuts
Comics by Louise Simonson
Comics characters introduced in 1988
Comics characters
Marvel Comics titles
X-Men supporting characters
X-Men titles
X-Factor (comics)